Jordan Stewart (born 28 December 1996) is a Canadian taekwondo practitioner.

Career
In 2019, Stewart qualified and was named to Canada's 2019 Pan American Games team in Lima, Peru.

References

1996 births
Living people
Canadian male taekwondo practitioners
Taekwondo practitioners at the 2019 Pan American Games
Pan American Games competitors for Canada
21st-century Canadian people